Mary Bailey may refer to:

People
Mary Bailey (aviator) (1890–1960), British aviator
Mary Barbara Bailey (1910–2003), British Roman Catholic
Mary Johnson Bailey Lincoln (1844–1921), American teacher and cookbook author

Characters
Mary Bailey (Jericho), a character in Jericho
Mary Bailey (The Simpsons), the Governor in The Simpsons
Mary Hatch Bailey, George Bailey's wife in the film It's a Wonderful Life